Elsa Bruckmann (23 February 1865 – 7 June 1946), born Princess Cantacuzene of Romania, was since 1898 the wife of Hugo Bruckmann, Munich publisher of the writings of Houston Stewart Chamberlain. She held the "Salon Bruckmann" and made it a mission to introduce Adolf Hitler to leading industrialists.

See also
 Alfred Schuler

References

https://books.google.co.uk/books?id=QdtzQBDzxA8C&pg=PA27&lpg=PA27&dq=Elsa+Bruckmann&source=bl&ots=YQdKxO87pa&sig=kWJtSxBe5wUQ0Tjlk7mG9ukWkaA&hl=en&sa=X&ei=2ekPVbupFISuPK7ugbAE&ved=0CD0Q6AEwBw#v=onepage&q=Elsa%20Bruckmann&f=false
http://greece.greekreporter.com/2014/01/20/princess-elsa-the-hitler-supporter-of-byzantine-origin/
http://greece.greekreporter.com/tag/elsa-bruckmann/

Nazi propagandists
Romanian princesses
1865 births
1946 deaths
German salon-holders
Nobility in the Nazi Party
Women in Nazi Germany